Tomás de Teresa Colina  (born 5 September 1968 in Santoña, Cantabria) is a former Spanish middle distance runner who participated in the 1991 World Championships final in Tokyo over 800 m. He won a silver medal at the World Indoor Championships the same year, as well as a bronze medal at the 1994 European Championships.

International competitions

1Representing Europe

Personal bests
Outdoor
800 metres – 1:44.99 (Seville 1990)
1000 metres – 2:19.99 (Madrid 1994)
Indoor
800 metres – 1:46.97 (Seville 1989)
1000 metres – 2:27.49 (Madrid 1997)

References

All-Athletics profile
RFEA profile

1968 births
Living people
Spanish male middle-distance runners
Athletes from Cantabria
Athletes (track and field) at the 1988 Summer Olympics
Athletes (track and field) at the 1992 Summer Olympics
Olympic athletes of Spain
European Athletics Championships medalists
20th-century Spanish people